Joan Ramón García Castejón, Elche, (December 17, 1945), known as Joan Castejón is a Spanish draftsman, painter and sculptor, considered one of the leading representatives of social realism in the Spanish postwar plastic renewal. Member of the Grup d'Elx.

His work has been exhibited in some of the most important museums in Spain, among others, the Institut Valencià d'Art Modern (IVAM), the Museum of the University of Alicante, Guerricabeitia Martinez Collection at the University of Valencia, Miguel Hernández University of Elche, the Bancaja Foundation Center, Centre of the Carmen Valencia,  and the Museum of Contemporary Art of Elche.

Biography

Early life 
At sixteen he moved to Valencia, where he received training in fine arts at the Academy of San Carlos. His first solo exhibition took place in the Valencian art gallery Mateu in 1966. This first moment of his career (1964-1967) can be described as neofigurative. The human figure (sometimes grouped) appears in the middle of undefined spaces. Works from this stage, including anthropomorphic themed drawings, announce the peculiar features that characterize his later works: a tense correctness of line which develops vigorous anatomic effects.

Court-martial 
That momentum of his career was cut abruptly, however, by the participation in demonstrations of May 1967 in Valencia against Francoist regimen. After standing up for a friend who was being brutally beat, a plainclothes agent arrested Castejón. He received several beatings that night and short after that he was sentenced by the Francoist court-martial to six years in prison.

Political imprisonment 

Until mid 1969 he remains in prisons of Valencia and Teruel. That year became part of the Grup d'Elx in its second stage, participating regularly in all the exhibitions of the group until 1971. As a consequence of these doings he was taken back to a prison in the Canary Islands for another seven months in 1971. He does not leave the creative work in prison, where he draws two thousand drawings with wax or pencil at this time, defining another stage of production inevitably influenced by these circumstances.

Dénia 
Castejón married Paca Galván in 1973 and returned to Valencia where he briefly rejoined the local art scene, but a year later he settled permanently in Dénia, a small city on the coast. Taking up painting, he opted for a more explicit and shocking expressionism during the end of the 70s. Later in the 80s, he explored a brighter abstraction inspired by the landscape, while an increasingly theatrical virtuoso drawing dominated the 90s. The human being became the central reference of his work. Mankind is always addressed as tragic matter, as a heroic thing that has been beaten, subjected after a struggle with destiny and with an adverse world.

In 1999 he was honored as Adopted Son by the city Dénia, where he has lived since 1974.

Works 

If there is one aspect that stands out in the work of Joan Castejón is his drawing skill, also in his painting. José Manuel Caballero Bonald wrote regarding this: "the artist draws a classic and meditate as a prophet". The author and official historian of Alicante Enrique Cerdan Tato wrote in El Pais on Castejón's works: " ... he wanted to express a human universe revealed by violence: the helpless crowd was resolved in a powerful blast of fragments, lines, volumes, bestiaries and masks".

On leaving prison he painted a series of one hundred works inspired by the Gabriel García Márquez novel One Hundred Years of Solitude, which was exhibited in Valencia and Barcelona. Mario Vargas Llosa wrote on this occasion about Castejón's art: "One of the most interesting aspects of this collection of paintings by Castejón is showing us that even today the art of painting can, without giving anything for their own purposes or abandon modernity, have the literature as a starting point. Like a woman, a dream, or a crime, a novel can be for an artist a creative ferment... " 

Martí Dominguez published in the pages of El País about the drawing skills in the art of Castejón: "Any exaggeration is objectionable, and to say that Joan Castejón is possibly the Spanish artist who at this moment dominates human anatomy at its best may seem a excess, but it is not."

According to the art critic Román de la Calle, "his existential drama reflects a strong moral commitment that transcends any cynical or political pamphlet temptation. Castejón evokes a reality with surreal symbolic ingredients and allegorical translations from his personal experience. Virtuosity in the expressionist treatment of the human body is patent."

His exhibition "Per a Paca" crossed the province of Alicante between 2009 and 2010 as a tribute to his wife. According to the newspaper La Verdad is "a retrospective of historical memories of the couple. This is an abstract exhibition with over 50 works, scenes of pain and surprise with a retrospective review that allows access to various historical moments."

List of selected works 
 Maternidad gris (1969)
 The’y were more than three thousand (1973)
 Characters reduced by their own deeds (1974)
 La digestió (1978)
 Mutant d'águila irreal (1980)
 The day (1984)
 A Salvador Espriu (1989)
 Paisatge daurat 1993 (1993)
 El Salt (2002)
 Cavall nocturn (2004)
 The War (2009)

Museology 
The largest public collection of works by Castejón is gathered at the Museum of Contemporary Art in his hometown Elche. The largest private collection was the collection Lecasse Foundation in Alcoy, containing about two hundred works acquired by businessman Lionel Grau Mullor during the eighties and nineties. Currently this collection was divided among his heirs. The collection of drawings dedicated to Don Quixote belong to the IVAM. Another good part of Parts is in the collection of Foundation Bancaja, Valencia.

List of awards 
 Total Art Work Award, given by the Wagner Society of Alicante, 2014
 Premio Ocell, by the Mancomunitat de la Marina Alta. 2005.
 Honour member of the Institut d'Estudis Comarcals del Baix Vinalopó. 2001.
 Honour member of the Institut d'Estudis Comarcals de la Marina Alta. 1999.
 Adoptive Son of the city of Dénia. Ajuntament de Dénia. 1999.
 Premi la Tardor, by the Universitat Politècnica de València. 1994.
 Homage to Joan Castejón. Key of the City of Mont De Marsan. France. 1993.

See also 
 Social realism
 Grup d'Elx

References

Bibliography 
 DE LA CALLE, Román. Castejón: La realidad de lo imaginario, València: CIMAL, 1981–82, p. 16
 SEBASTIÁ, Jordi. La meua vocació de pintar es absoluta, entrevista an El Temps 899, 4-10 Septembre, 2001, pp. 35–37.

External links

Other links 
 Official website of Joan Castejón
 Official website of the Cityhall of Elche, hometown of the artist, that explains the importance of Castejón and the Grup d'Elx artistic activity.

Reports 
 El País: "El Grup d'Elx regresa tras 27 años"
 El País: "Condenado a tres años de dibujos forzados"

Interviews 
 Mar Menéndez interviews Joan Castejón  for the IVAM

1945 births
People from Alicante
Spanish artists
20th-century Spanish painters
Spanish male painters
Spanish children's book illustrators
Spanish agnostics
Spanish printmakers
Spanish surrealist artists
20th-century Spanish sculptors
20th-century Spanish male artists
Spanish male sculptors
Living people
20th-century printmakers